Leo Kofler (also known by the pseudonyms Stanislaw Warynski or Jules Dévérité; 26 April 1907 – 29 July 1995) was an Austrian-German Marxist sociologist. He ranks with the Marburg politicologist Wolfgang Abendroth and the Frankfurt school theoreticians Max Horkheimer and Theodor W. Adorno among the few well-known Marxist intellectuals in post-war Germany. However, almost nothing of his work was ever translated into English, and he is therefore little known in the English-speaking world. Kofler had his own, distinctive interpretation of Marxism, which connected sociology and history with aesthetics and anthropology.

Biography
Kofler was born of Jewish parents on 26 April 1907 in Chotymyr, Galicia, Austria-Hungary (now Ivano-Frankivsk Raion, Ivano-Frankivsk Oblast, Ukraine). World War I in 1915/16 drove his family to escape to Vienna, where Leo attended business school, until 1927. His working career was cut short by the 1929 stock crash, and he became an adviser of a social-democratic education center in Vienna, joining the left-wing of the social-democratic labour party (SDAP). From 1933-34, he devoted himself to research with Max Adler. In July 1938, after the annexation of Austria by Nazi Germany, he escaped to Basel, Switzerland where he was interned in an immigrant camp. Most of his family was murdered in the Holocaust, and his parents were shot in 1942. Nevertheless, he continued his theoretical studies, being influenced especially by the writings of Georg Lukács. In  1944 he published his first book under the pseudonym "Stanislaw Warynski".

His second book, on the history of the civil society, was published in 1948 in East Germany. In September 1947 he moved to the Soviet-occupied zone of Germany, and in 1948 became lecturer in medieval and modern history at the University of Halle. But after his public criticism of the Stalinization of the Socialist Unity Party, he was dismissed from his post. At the end of 1950, he escaped with his future wife Ursula Wieck to Cologne in West Germany, and worked there as well as in Dortmund and Bochum as lecturer and researcher, publishing a stream of books and articles.

He died on 29 July 1995 in Cologne after a lengthy illness.

Main works

  Die Wissenschaft von der Gesellschaft , 1944, 1971
Zur Geschichte der bürgerlichen Gesellschaft. Versuch einer verstehenden Deutung der Neuzeit, 1948.
Stalinistischer Marxismus, 1951
Das Wesen und die Rolle der stalinistischen Bürokratie, 1952.
  Der Fall Lukacs. Georg Lukacs und der Stalinismus, 1952
 Geschichte und Dialektik, 1955
 Staat, Gesellschaft und Elite zwischen Humanismus und Nihilismus, 1960
 Das Ende der Philosophie?, 1961
 Zur Theorie der modernen Literatur, 1962
Der proletarische Bürger, 1964
Der asketische Eros. Industriekultur und Ideologie, 1967
Perspektiven des revolutionären Humanismus, 1968
 Marxistische Staatstheorie, 1970
 Stalinismus und Bürokratie, 1970
Kunst und absurde Literatur 1970, 
 Technologische Rationalität im Spätkapitalismus, 1971
In Aggression und Gewissen. Grundlegung einer anthropologischen Erkentnnistheorie 1973
Haut den Lukács. Realismus und Subjektivismus 1977. 
 Der Alltag zwischen Eros und Entfremdung, 1982
 Beherrscht uns die Technik? Technologische Rationalität im Spätkapitalismus, 1983
 Aggression und Gewissen. Grundlegung einer anthropologischen Erkenntnistheorie, 1973
 Soziologie des Ideologischen, 1975
 Geistiger Verfall und progressive Elite, 1981
Der Alltag zwischen Eros und Entfremdung. Perspektiven zu einer Wissenschaft von Alltag, 1982.
 Eros, Ästhetik, Politik. Thesen zum Menschenbild bei Marx, 1985
Aufbruch in der Sowjetunion? 1986
 Die Vergeistigung der Herrschaft, 2 Bände 1986/87
 Avantgardismus als Entfremdung. Ästhetik und Ideologiekritik, 1987
  "Die Kritik ist der Kopf der Leidenschaft." Aus dem Leben eines marxistischen Grenzgängers. Ein Gespräch anlässlich seines 80. Geburtstages mit Wolf Schönleitner und Werner Seppmann, 1987
 Zur Kritik bürgerlicher Freiheit. Ausgewählte politisch-philosophische Texte eines marxistischen Einzelgängers, Hrsg. Christoph Jünke, 2000

Commentaries in German

Humanistische Anthropologie und dialektischer Materialismus. Ein Arbeitsbuch. Leo Kofler zum 70. Geburtstag. Broschiert - 320 Seiten, November 1982,  
Marxismus und Anthropologie. Festschrift für Leo Kofler. Bochum: Germinal Verlag, 1980.
Jünke, Christoph (Hg.), Am Beispiel Leo Koflers. Marxismus im 20. Jahrhundert. Münster: Verlag Westfälisches Dampfboot, 2001.

Commentaries in English
 Christoph Jünke: Leo Kofler’s Philosophy of Praxis: Western Marxism and Socialist Humanism. With Six Essays by Leo Kofler Published in English for the First Time. Brill: Leiden 2022, ISBN 978-90-04-50255-0.

External links
Leo Kofler Society (in German) 
Leo Kofler as praxis-thinker (in German)
 Christoph Jünke: Leo Kofler Was a Marxist and a Revolutionary Humanist, jacobinmag.com, March 14th 2022

1907 births
1995 deaths
People from Ivano-Frankivsk Oblast
Ukrainian Jews
20th-century German philosophers
Jewish philosophers
German people of Polish-Jewish descent
Jews from Galicia (Eastern Europe)
Academic staff of the University of Halle
German male writers
German Marxist historians
Austrian emigrants to Germany